is a passenger railway station located in the city of Ōmihachiman, Shiga Prefecture, Japan, operated by the West Japan Railway Company (JR West).

Lines

Station layout
The station consists of two opposed side platforms connected by an elevated concourse. The station is staffed.

Platforms

History
Shinohara station opened on 20 April 1921, replacing a signal yard that had been in operation since 1 June 1918. The station became part of the West Japan Railway Company on 1 April 1987 due to the privatization and dissolution of the JNR.

Station numbering was introduced to the station in March 2018 with Shinohara being assigned station number JR-A20.

Passenger statistics
In fiscal 2019, the station was used by an average of 2,179 passengers daily (boarding passengers only).

Surrounding area
Polytech College Shiga
Shinohara Park

See also
List of railway stations in Japan

References

External links

JR West official home page

Tōkaidō Main Line
Railway stations in Shiga Prefecture
Railway stations in Japan opened in 1921
Ōmihachiman, Shiga